Anna Maestri (7 January 1924 – 4 March 1988) was an Italian stage, film and television actress.

Life and career 
Maestri was born in Mantua, the daughter of two stage actors. She formed at the Silvio d’Amico Academy of Dramatic Arts in Rome, and made her professional debut on stage in 1943 alongside Vittorio Gassman. After the war she  worked several times with Luchino Visconti, Luigi Squarzina and with Giorgio Strehler at the Piccolo Teatro in Milan. She was also active in musical comedies and revues, notably starring in Il terrore corre sul filo alongside Nino Taranto.  In 1963 she was awarded the San Genesio Prize for her performance in Robert Thomas' Eight Women. Maestri  was also active in films and on television, even if mainly cast in supporting roles.

Filmography

References

External links 

Anna's find-a-grave page

Actors from Mantua
Italian stage actresses
Italian film actresses
Italian television actresses
1924 births
1988 deaths
20th-century Italian actresses